Kucherivka was a selo at the border with Russia in Sumy Oblast, Ukraine.  It was heavily damaged and destroyed during the Russian invasion of Ukraine.  It is in the Shostka Raion on the Russia-Ukraine border.

References 

Villages in Shostka Raion